Plociella is a genus of beetles in the family Cerambycidae, containing the following species:

 Plociella mixta (Newman, 1842)
 Plociella sybroides (Schwarzer, 1931)

References

Apomecynini
Cerambycidae genera